Viktor Nikolayevich Ledovskikh (born 8 October 1967) is a former Russian professional football player.

Club career
He made his Russian Football National League debut for FC APK Azov on 3 April 1993 in a game against FC Spartak Anapa. That was his only season in the FNL.

External links
 

1967 births
Place of birth missing (living people)
Living people
Soviet footballers
Russian footballers
Association football midfielders
FC Shakhtar Donetsk players
FC APK Morozovsk players
FC Elektron Romny players
FC Molodechno players
FC Kommunalnik Slonim players
Ukrainian Amateur Football Championship players
Belarusian Premier League players
Russian expatriate footballers
Expatriate footballers in Ukraine
Expatriate footballers in Belarus
FC Mashuk-KMV Pyatigorsk players